The Biopôle Clermont-Limagne is a French science park and business incubator hosting biotechnology companies. 

It holds 3 different sites, all located close to Clermont-Ferrand in France: 
Saint-Beauzire (the initial location) 
Riom 
Clermont-Ferrand

It has been created in 1995 at the initiative of "Communauté de communes Limagne" of Ennezat.

In 2019, over 40 companies are active in the biopole, comprising , Carbios, Cyclopharma, Greentech, BioFilm Control, etc...

References 

Clermont-Ferrand
Science parks in France
Business incubators of France